Local elections were held in Baguio on Monday, May 9, 2022, as a part of the 2022 Philippine general election. Voters will elect candidates for the local elective posts in the city: the mayor, vice mayor, the congressman, and the twelve councilors.

Incumbent Mayor Benjamin Magalong won his re-election bid for the mayoralty race, beating former mayor Mauricio Domogan and former vice mayor Edison Bilog. Incumbent representative Mark Go, also won his bid for a third term. In the vice mayoral race, incumbent Vice Mayor Faustino Olowan also won his re-election bid, defeating incumbent Councilor and ABC President Michael Lawana, Councilor Joel Alangsab and Councilor Elaine Sembrano.

There were a total of 139,461 people who voted out of the 168,218 registered voters in the city.

Background 
Retired police general Benjamin Magalong won the mayoralty race in 2019, and is seeking re-election for a second term in office. Former mayor Mauricio Domogan, who ran for representative and lost to incumbent representative Mark Go, is seeking a political comeback and is running again for mayor.

During the onslaught of the COVID-19 pandemic, Magalong's government was highly praised for its efforts to contain the virus, and was even cited as a model city by the national government. Cities and municipalities around the country invited Magalong where he would share his government's best practices and case analysis approach towards combating the pandemic. In July 2020, President Duterte appointed Magalong as the country's contract tracing czar, tasked with training and intensifying the skillset of contact tracers as well as improve contract tracing systems in the county.

Electoral System 
Local elections are held every three years, on the second Monday of May coinciding with the elections for the national positions. An individual may only be elected to an office for a maximum of three consecutive terms.

Mayoral and Vice Mayoral Elections 
The first-past-the-post voting system is used to determine the mayor wherein the candidate with the most votes, whether or not one has a majority, wins the mayoralty.

The vice mayoral election is held separately but does observe the same rules. Voters are given the option to vote for candidates from different parties.

House of Representatives Elections 
The city is a lone district and elects a representative through the first-past-the-post voting system wherein the candidate with the most votes, whether or not one has a majority, wins the seat.

City Council Elections 
In the City Council, the city is represented by 12 councilors elected every three years. The twelve candidates with the most votes will be elected.

Retiring and term-limited incumbents

City Councilors 

 Joel Alangsab - running for Vice Mayor
 Elaine Sembrano - running for Vice Mayor
 Francisco Roberto Ortega VI - not term limited but not running for re-election

Tickets 
As the mayor, vice mayor and the members of the city council are elected on the same ballot, mayoral candidates may present or endorse a slate of city council candidates. These slates usually run with their respective mayoral and vice mayoral candidates along with the other members of their slate. A group of candidates independent of any mayoral or vice mayoral candidate may also form a slate consisting of themselves.

Administration coalition

Primary opposition coalition

Secondary opposition coalition

Other tickets

Non-independents not in Tickets

Independents not in tickets

Mayoral election 
Incumbent mayor Benjamin Magalong was elected in 2019 and is running for a second term.

Candidates 

 Edison Bilog, Vice Mayor of Baguio (2014-2019), Councilor (2010-2014)
 Mauricio Domogan, Representative of Baguio (2001-2010), Mayor of Baguio (1992-2001;2010-2019), Vice Mayor of Baguio (1992), Councilor (1988-1992)
 Benjamin Magalong, Mayor of Baguio (2019–present)
 Jeffrey Pinic

Results

Vice mayoral election 
Incumbent vice mayor Faustino Olowan is running for re-election.

Candidates 

 Joel Alangsab, Councilor (2013–present), ABC President (ex officio Councilor) (2008-2013)
 Michael Lawana, ABC President (ex officio Councilor) (2016–present)
 Faustino Olowan, Vice Mayor of Baguio (2019–present), Councilor (2013-2019)
 Elaine Sembrano, Councilor (2001-2010; 2013–present)

Results

Congressional election 
Incumbent Representative Mark Go is running for a third term.

Candidates 

 Alexis Abano
 Nicasio Aliping Jr., Representative of Baguio (2013-2016)
 Reynaldo Diaz Jr.
 Edgardo Duque
 Mark Go, Representative of Baguio (2016–present)
 Rafael Wasan

Results

City Council election 
The 12 of 14 members of the Baguio City Council are elected at-large via multiple non-transferable vote, where each voter has 12 votes, and can vote up to 12 candidates. The 12 candidates with the highest number of votes are elected.

The other 2 members are elected in indirect elections from the results of barangay elections.

Results 

|-bgcolor=black
|colspan=5|

References 

2022 Philippine local elections
May 2022 events in the Philippines
Elections in Benguet
Elections in Baguio